The Mann-Zwonecek House is a historic house in Wilber, Nebraska. It was built in 1881 for businessman William H. Mann, and designed in the Italianate and Second Empire architectural styles. It belonged to the Zwonecek family from 1894 to 1968. By the 1970s, it was "the only extant home of imposing grandeur in Wilber dating to the early 1880s." It has been listed on the National Register of Historic Places since December 29, 1978.

References

External links

National Register of Historic Places in Saline County, Nebraska
Italianate architecture in Nebraska
Second Empire architecture in Nebraska
Houses completed in 1881